Banned substance may refer to:

 A performance-enhancing substance that is banned by a sports league; see Doping in sport
 Illegal drug trade
 Red List building materials
 List of chemical arms control agreements
 Toxic Substances Control Act of 1976